Sir John Rice Crowe (November 20, 1795 – January 10, 1877) was an English businessman and diplomat who spent much of his life in Norway. He was the British consul-general in Norway, residing in Christiania, from 1843.

Together with Henry Dick Woodfall, John Rice Crowe started the company Alten Copper Works in Alta around 1826. This company was later renamed the Kåfjord Copper Works.

Diplomat
After serving for six years as a British diplomat in Russia, Crowe became the deputy vice-consul in Hammerfest in 1824. Thirteen years later, in 1837, he was appointed British consul in Finnmark, with the requirement to live in Hammerfest. In 1843 he became the general consul for Norway; as such he was the highest British representative in Norway.

Family
Crowe's uncle was an admiral in the English navy. Crowe was married to a Norwegian, Malene Marie Waad (1802–1843).

His daughter Anna Cecilie Crowe (1829–1914) was married to major Norwegian industrialist Halvor Schou. His son Henry Woodfall Crowe was British consul in Helsingfors. His son Septimus Crowe (1842–1903) was British Vice Consul and acting Consul-General in Christiania, but emigrated to Mexico in the 1880s.

Honours
He became a Companion of the British Order of the Bath in 1859 for outstanding service as a diplomat for his homeland. In Norway he became a Commander of the Order of St. Olav. Crowe was knighted by Queen Victoria on 7 July 1874.

References

1795 births
1877 deaths
19th-century English businesspeople
Gáivuotna–Kåfjord
British emigrants to Norway
Knights Bachelor
Companions of the Order of the Bath
Order of Saint Olav
People from Hammerfest